Relative may refer to:

General use
Kinship and family, the principle binding the most basic social units society. If two people are connected by circumstances of birth, they are said to be relatives

Philosophy
Relativism, the concept that points of view have no absolute truth or validity, having only relative, subjective value according to differences in perception and consideration, or relatively, as in the relative value of an object to a person
Relative value (philosophy)

Economics
Relative value (economics)

Popular culture

Film and television 
Relatively Speaking (1965 play), 1965 British play
Relatively Speaking (game show), late 1980s television game show
Everything's Relative (episode)#Yu-Gi-Oh! (Yu-Gi-Oh! Duel Monsters), 2000 Japanese anime Yu-Gi-Oh! Duel Monsters episode
Relative Values, 2000 film based on the play of the same name.
It's All Relative, 2003-4 comedy television series
Intelligence is Relative, tag line for the 2008 film Burn After Reading
Relative (film), a 2022 drama/comedy feature film

Literature 
The Relativity of Wrong, 1988 Isaac Asimov essay
Relative Heroes, 2000 DC comic book series
Time and Relative, 2001 Doctor Who book
Relative Dementias, 2002 Doctor Who book series

Music 
Friends & Relatives, 1999 compilation album
Dead Relatives, 2000 music album by Canadian Emm Gryner
Relative Ways, 2001 music album by ...And You Will Know Us by the Trail of Dead

Physics
Relative is a term used in physics, and especially in Galilean, special and general relativity, to denote that something is dependent on a reference frame, or that it is taken specifically in a given reference frame ("its velocity relative to the cow is 15.5m/s", "time and Space are relative, not fixed")

See also
Rel (disambiguation)
Relation (disambiguation)
Relatives (disambiguation)
Relativity (disambiguation)